The Legislative Assembly of Emilia-Romagna (Assemblea Legislativa dell'Emilia-Romagna) is the regional council, hence the regional legislative authority, of Emilia-Romagna.

It was first elected in 1970, when the ordinary Regions were instituted, on the basis of the Constitution of Italy of 1948.

Composition
The Legislative Assembly of Emilia-Romagna is composed of 50 members, of which 39 are elected in provincial constituencies with proportional representation, 11 from the so-called "regional list" of the elected President and the last one is for the candidate for President who comes second, who usually becomes the leader of the opposition in the Council. If a coalition wins more than 55% of the vote, only 6 candidates from the "regional list" will be elected and the number of those elected in provincial constituencies will be 43.

The Assembly is elected for a five-year term, but, if the President suffers a vote of no confidence, resigns or dies, under the simul stabunt vel simul cadent clause (introduced in 1999), also the Assembly will be dissolved and there will be a fresh election.

Political groups
The Assembly is currently composed of the following political groups:

Presidents of the Legislative Assembly

See also
 Regional council (Italy)
 Emilia-Romagna
 Politics of Emilia-Romagna
 Politics of Italy

References

Emilia-Romagna
Legislative
Emilia-Romagna